The 1992 Mid-Continent Conference Tournament took place from May 15 through 18. The top six regular season finishers of the league's nine teams met in the double-elimination tournament held in Chicago, Illinois.  won the tournament for the first and only time.

Format and seeding
The top three teams from each division advanced to the tournament.

Tournament
Bracket to be included

Game-by-game results

All-Tournament Team

Tournament Most Valuable Player
Jon Sbrocco of Wright State was named Tournament MVP.

References

Tournament
Summit League Baseball Tournament
Mid-Continent Conference baseball tournament
Mid-Continent Conference baseball tournament